Bagossy de Bagos et Kaplony (or Bagosi) was a Hungarian noble family from the kindred of Kaplon. The family was located in Szatmár County.

History
The first known ancestor was Andrew, who lived in the early 12th century. His son was Simon Ördög, who was mentioned in the contemporary sources in 1264. Simon had four sons: Andrew, the forefather of the Károlyi family, Endus, Mikó and Peter who had three children from Anna, the daughter of Lawrence Széplaki from the kindred of Turul: Peter Zonga, the ancestor of the Vetési family (or Vetéssy), Martin, the ancestor of the Csomaközy family and John who founded the Bagossy family.

The estate of the family was Csengerbagos (today: Boghiș, Romania). They were received the right of blood court by Louis I of Hungary in 1354. Later Sigismund confirmed their jurisdictional privileges along with the Vetési family in 1409. The Diet of Szatmáry Country were held several times (e. g. 1306 and 1718) in Csengerbagos. The Bagossys also built a church in the 15th century. László Bagossy settled Vlachs in 1731.

Coat of arms
In a round blue shield surrounded by a green dragon, a black eagle (or sparrow hawk) stands in a triple green hill and turns rights to extending wings and holds a red heart in his right leg. Maybe the Bagossy de Dancsháza was originated as the branch of this family.

Notable members
 Mihály, judge of the Tabula Regia in the Diet of Rákos (1505)
 Pál, vice-ispán of Szatmár County (1603–1608)
 Pál, Kuruc general, vice-captain of Szentjobb
 László, vice-ispán of Szatmár County (1714–1727; 1734)

Sources
 Pallas Great lexicon
 János Karácsonyi: A magyar nemzetségek a XIV. század közepéig. Budapest: Magyar Tudományos Akadémia. 1900–1901.
 Samu Borovszki: Szatmár vármegye.

Kaplon (genus)
Hungarian noble families